This is a list of political parties in South Africa. South Africa is a democratic but one-party dominant state with the African National Congress as the governing party. Other parties such as the Democratic Alliance govern provinces and municipalities, with some in coalitions with smaller parties.

Parliamentary parties

Other parties with representation

Defunct parties

Extra-parliamentary parties

Activists Movement of South Africa (AMSA)
Africa Muslim Party (AMP)
African Change Academy
African Christian Alliance (ACA)
African Content Movement (ACM)
African Covenant (ACO)
African Mantungwa Community (AC)
African Renaissance Unity (ARU)
African Security Congress (ASC)
Afrikaner Volksparty
Agang South Africa
All Things Are Possible
Alliance for Transformation for All (ATA)
Black First Land First (BLF)
Cape Muslim Congress (CMC)
Capitalist Party of South Africa (ZACP)
CHANGE (CHANGE)
Christian Democratic Party (CDP)
Civic Warriors of Maruleng (CWM)
Compatriots of South Africa (CSA)
Dabalorivhuwa Patriotic Front (DPF)
Dagga Party (IQELA LE)
Democratic Independent Party (DI)
Dikwankwetla Party (DPSA)
Economic Emancipation Forum (EEF)
ECOPEACE Party (ECOPEACE)
Federal Party SA (FPSA)
Free Democrats (FREE DEM)
Gazankulu Liberation Congress (GLC)
Green Party of South Africa (GPSA) 
Kannaland Independent Party (KANNALAN)
Karoo Democratic Force (KDF)
Karoo Gemeenskap Party (KGP)
Keep It Straight and Simple Party (KISS Party)
Kingdom Governance Movement
Land Party (LAND)
MAP16 Civic Movement (MAP16)
 Namakwa Civic Movement (NCM)
National Conservative Party of South Africa (NKP)
National Party South Africa (NP)
National People's Ambassadors (NPA)
National People's Front (NAPF)
National Religious Freedom Party (NRFP)
New South Africa Party
The Organic Humanity Movement (OHM)
Pan Africanist Movement (PAM)
Peace and Justice Congress (PJC)
Sakhisizwe Convention (S.C.)
 Siyathemba Community Movement (SCM)
Socialist Green Coalition (SGC)
Socialist Revolutionary Workers Party (SRWP)
South African Communist Party (SACP) – part of the ANC-led "Tripartite Alliance"
South African National Congress of Traditional Authorities (SANCOTA)
South African Political Party (SAPP)
Spectrum National Party (SNP)
Sterkspruit Civic Association (SCA)
The Peoples Independent Civic Organisation (TPICO)
True Freedom Party
Truly Alliance (TA)
United Congress (UNICO)
Uniting People First
Us the People (US) 
Women Forward (WF)
Workers and Socialist Party (WASP)
Ximoko Party (XP)

Defunct parties

 Abolition of Income Tax and Usury Party (1994–?)
 Afrikaner Party (AP; 1941–1951)
 Boerestaat Party (BSP)
 Christen Party/Christian Party (2005–?)
 Christian Democratic Alliance (?–2009)
 Christian Front (CF) (???–2014)
 Democratic Left Front (2011–2015)
 Democratic Party (DP; 1973–1977)
 Dominion Party (1934–1948)
 Federal Alliance (FA; 1998–2007)
 Federation of Democrats (2005–?)
 Front Nasionaal (FN; 2013–2020) (previously Federale Vryheidsparty)
 Herstigte Nasionale Party (HNP)
 Khoisan Aboriginal and Others Movement (2008–?)
 Labour Party (1910–1958)
 Labour Party (1969–1994)
 Liberal Party of South Africa (1953–1968)
 Nasionale Aksie (NA; 2003–2004)
 National Alliance (NA; 2009)
 National Democratic Convention (NADECO; 2005–2009)
 National People's Party (NPP; 2007–2016)
 New Labour Party (NLP; 2004–2009)
 Pro-death Penalty Party (2004?)
 Progressive Reform Party (1975–1977)
 Reform Party (1975–1975)
 Socialist Party of Azania (SOPA; 1998–2014)
 South African Business Party (SABP; ?–2012)
 South African Democratic Congress (Sadeco; 2008–2011)
 South African Party (SAP; 1911–1934)
 Ubuntu Party (2012–2020)
 United Independent Front (UIF; 2005–2010)
 United Party (UP; 1934–1977)
 Workers Organisation for Socialist Action (WOSA; 1990–?)

See also
Politics of South Africa
List of political parties by country

References

External links
Independent Electoral Commission

ANC's foes rise up
Konrad-Adenauer-Stiftung: Political Parties in South Africa 

 
South Africa
Political parties
Political parties
South Africa